The Philippines participated in the 2013 Asian Indoor and Martial Arts Games held in Incheon, South Korea from June 29 to July 6.

Medalists

Gold

Bronze

Multiple

Medal summary

By sports

References

 Official site

Nations at the 2013 Asian Indoor and Martial Arts Games
Asian Indoor Games
Philippines at the Asian Indoor Games